Erythrolamprus triscalis, the three-scaled ground snake,  is a species of snake in the family Colubridae. The species is found in Curacao.

References

Erythrolamprus
Reptiles described in 1758
Taxa named by Carl Linnaeus